People with the German surname Hamann include:

Politicians and military personnel 
A. P. Hamann (1909–1977), American politician
Adolf Hamann (1885–1945), German Nazi general executed for war crimes
Joachim Hamann (1913–1945), Nazi officer, Holocaust perpetrator
Karl Hamann (1903–1973), Liberal politician in the Communist German Democratic Republic

Authors and media people 
Brigitte Hamann (1940–2016), German-Austrian historian
Evelyn Hamann (1942–2007), German actress
Hilary Thayer Hamann (born 1962), American author
Ilene Hamann (born 1984), South African actress and model
Jack Hamann (born 1954), American television correspondent and author
Johann Georg Hamann (1730–1788), German philosopher
 Richard Hamann (1879–1961), German art historian

Sportspeople

Association football
Dietmar Hamann (born 1973), German footballer, coach and pundit
Erich Hamann (born 1944), East German footballer and manager
Matthias Hamann (born 1968), German footballer

Basketball
Steffen Hamann (born 1981), German basketball player
 Ray Hamann (1911–2005), American basketball player, mostly for the Oshkosh All-Stars

Other sports
Birgit Hamann (born 1969), German hurdler
Conny Hamann (born 1969), Danish handball player
Doc Hamann (1900–1973), baseball player
Helmut Hamann (1912–1941), German 400 metres runner
Lars Hamann (born 1989), German javelin thrower
Monika Hamann (born 1954), East German sprinter

Svend Hamann (born 1940), Danish chess master

Other 
 Christel Hamann (1847–1948), German inventor of mechanical calculators etc. 
 Johanna Hamann (1954–2017), Peruvian sculptor
 Stephan Hamann, American psychology professor

See also 
Hamann Motorsport

Surnames